The following is a list of Teen Choice Award winners and nominees for Choice Summer Music Star: Male. It was first introduced in 2010.

Winners and nominees

References

Summer Music Star Male
Music Star Male